Moturu is a village in Krishna district of the Indian state of Andhra Pradesh. It is located in Gudivada mandal of Gudivada revenue division. It is one of the villages in the mandal to be a part of Andhra Pradesh Capital Region.

References 

Villages in Krishna district